Quengococha (possibly from Quechua q'inqu zig-zag qucha lake, "zig-zag lake") is a lake in Peru located in the Cajamarca Region, Cajabamba Province, Cajabamba District, in the east of the Cajabamba District. Quengococha lies southeast of the lake Yaguarcocha.

References 

Lakes of Cajamarca Region
Lakes of Peru